Nairobi City Stars is an association football club based in Nairobi, Kenya that currently competes in the first tier Kenyan Premier League.

History 
The club was founded in 2003 as World Hope Football Club after a majority of players followed head coach Zedekiah 'Zico' Otieno from relegated Kawangware United. The club was formed and owned by World Hope International, a charitable organization.

After one season in the Nationwide League, World Hope was promoted to the Kenyan Premier League.

In October 2008, the club was bought by Ambassadors in Sport (AIS Kenya), who renamed the club to Nairobi City Stars FC after the 2008 season. 

After the take over Nairobi City Stars was initially coached by German manager Oliver Page, a former Bundesliga player. He resigned from the post-half-season in June 2009 despite good results, citing personal issues

After a short while under the new owners, the team reverted to Peter Jabuya who would struggle with the team till March 2019 when the club was fully acquired by Jonathan Jackson Foundation, a community-focused setup named after its founder Jonathan Jackson who is a real estate mogul in Kenya and in Europe.

Upon the change of hands the new owners hired online journalist Patrick Korir as the CEO to streamline the club's operations. And in July 2019 the club went searching for a foreign coach and hired Sarajevo-born Sanjin Alagić, a UEFA Pro licensed coach from Bosnia and Herzegovina.

He led the team to the 2019/20 Kenyan National Super League title and automatic promotion back to the Kenyan Premier League after four seasons out.

Alagić exited at the expiry of his contract at the end of June 2021. From September of the same year Nicholas Muyoti was appointed the new coach on a three-year deal.

Honors
Kenya Nationwide League
 Champions (1): 2003/4
FKF President's Cup
 Champions (1): 2005
Kenyan National Super League
 Champions (1): 2019/20

Performance in CAF competitions
CAF Confederation Cup: 1 appearance
2006 – Preliminary Round

Current squad

Club officials

Management

Technical Bench

Past coaches

 Zedekiah 'Zico' Otieno (Sep 2003-Nov 2004)
 Robert Matano (Nov 2004 - Nov 2007)
 John “Bobby” Ogolla (Jan-Nov 2008)
 Oliver Pagé (Nov 2008-May 2009)
 Kennedy Odhiambo (May 2009-Aug 2011)
 Gideon Ochieng (Aug 2011-Sep 2012)
 Bai Malleh Wadda (Sep 2012-June 2013)
 Charles Omondi (June-Sep 2013)
 Jan Koops (Sep 2013-Jan 2014)
 Robinson Ndubuisi (Jan-Apr 2014)
 Tim Bryett (Apr-Jul 2014)
 Robinson Ndubuisi (Jul-Dec 2014)
 Paul Nkata (Jan-June 2015)
 Gabriel Njoroge (Jul-Sep 2015)
 Dennis Okoth  (Sep-Dec 2015)
 John “Bobby” Ogolla  (Jan-June 2016)
 Richard Pinto Tamale (Jul-Dec 2016)
 Robert Matano (Jan-May 2017)
 Abdul-Samadu Musafiri (Jul-Dec 2017)
 John Amboko (Jan-Dec 2018)
 Jimmy Kintu (Jan-Apr 2019)
 John Amboko (Apr-Jun 2019)
 Sanjin Alagić (July 2019 - June 2021)
 John Amboko (Jul-Aug 2019)
 Nicholas Muyoti (Sept 2021 - to date)

Notable past players

  Victor Wanyama
  John Mark Makwatta
  Dan Sserunkuma
  James Situma
  Pascal Ochieng
  Kennedy Odhiambo
  Thomas Wanyama
  George Odhiambo
  Harrison Muranda
  Collins Tiego
  Levy Muaka
  Wesley Onguso
  George Abege
  Francis Thairu
  George Midenyo
  George Odary
  Victor Ochieng
  Erick Ochieng
  Paul Okatwa
  Lawrence Kasadha
  Justus Basweti
  Kevin Ochieng
  Noah Abich
  Edward Karanja

Top scorers per season
Top scorers per season. * Award shared during that season

All time top scorers
A list of all-time Nairobi City Stars goalscorers. For players who have scored 12 or more goals.

As of 12 June 2022

* Still active

Records
Record victory: 4–0 vs. Vihiga Bullets on 6 Nov 2021  
Record victory: 4–0 vs. Kisumu Telkom on 11 Feb 06 
Record victory: 4–0 vs. Congo United on 22 Oct 2011  
Record defeat: 0–5 vs. Sofapaka F.C. on 7 Aug 2016 
Best league performance: 5th in 2021-22 Kenyan Premier League

Premier League records

CS - Clean Sheet

Second tier League records

Most Kenyan Premier League appearances
221 - John Amboko  at GAS

Record all-time goalscorer
35 – Justus Basweti

Record Kenyan National Super League goalscorer
17 - Davis Agesa

Record Kenyan Premier League goalscorer
27 - Justus Basweti

Most capped players
42 – James Situma – Kenya national football team (2009–2016)
34 – Peter Opiyo – Kenya national football team (2009–2014)

References

External links
 Nairobi City Stars GSA
 Nairobi City Stars  Soccerway

Kenyan National Super League clubs
Sport in Nairobi
Football clubs in Kenya

da:Nairobi City Stars